Mahmudabad-e Seyyed Rural District is a rural district (dehestan) in the Central District of Sirjan County, Kerman Province, Iran. At the 2006 census, its population was 7,923, in 1,936 families. The rural district has 23 villages.

References 

Rural Districts of Kerman Province
Sirjan County